Panama will participate in the 2011 Parapan American Games.

Athletics

Panama will send two male athletes to compete.

Nations at the 2011 Parapan American Games
2011 in Panamanian sport
Panama at the Pan American Games